You Can't Take It with You is a 1938 American romantic comedy film directed by Frank Capra and starring Jean Arthur, Lionel Barrymore, James Stewart, and Edward Arnold. Adapted by Robert Riskin from the Pulitzer Prize-winning 1936 play of the same name by George S. Kaufman and Moss Hart, the film is about a man from a family of rich snobs who becomes engaged to a woman from a good-natured, but decidedly eccentric family.

A critical and commercial success, the film received two Academy Awards from seven nominations: Best Picture and Best Director for Frank Capra. This was Capra's third Oscar for Best Director in just five years, following It Happened One Night (1934) and Mr. Deeds Goes to Town (1936).

Plot
A successful banker, Anthony P. Kirby (Edward Arnold), has just returned from Washington, DC, where he was effectively granted a government-sanctioned munitions monopoly, which will make him very rich. He intends to buy up a 12-block radius around a competitor's factory to put him out of business, but one house is a holdout to selling. Kirby instructs his real-estate broker, John Blakely (Clarence Wilson), to offer a huge sum for the house, and if that is not accepted, to cause trouble for the family. Meanwhile, Grandpa Vanderhof (Lionel Barrymore) convinces a banker named Poppins to pursue his dream of making animated toys.

Kirby's son, Tony (James Stewart), a vice president in the family company, has fallen in love with a company stenographer, Alice Sycamore (Jean Arthur). When Tony proposes marriage, Alice is worried that her family would be looked upon poorly by Tony's rich and famous family. In fact, Alice is the only relatively normal member of the eccentric Sycamore family, led by Vanderhof. Unbeknownst to the players, Alice's family lives in the house that will not sell out.

Kirby and his wife (Mary Forbes) strongly disapprove of Tony's choice for marriage. Before she accepts, Alice forces Tony to bring his family to become better acquainted with their future in-laws, but when Tony purposely brings his family on the wrong day (reasoning that he would rather the two families meet as they are, not in a formal 'stuffed-shirt' setting), the Sycamore family is caught off-guard, and the house is in disarray. As the Kirbys are preparing to leave after a rather disastrous meeting, the police arrive in response to what they perceive as printed threats on flyers by Grandpa's son-in-law, Ed Carmichael. When the fireworks in the basement go off, they arrest everyone in the house.

Held up in the drunk tank preparing to see the night-court judge, Mrs. Kirby repeatedly insults Alice and makes her feel unworthy of her son, while Grandpa explains to Kirby the importance of having friends, and that despite all the wealth and success in business, "you can't take it with you". At the court hearing, the judge (Harry Davenport) allows for Grandpa and his family to settle the charges for disturbing the peace and making illegal fireworks by assessing a fine, for which Grandpa's neighborhood friends pitch in to pay. He repeatedly asks why the Kirbys were at the Vanderhof house. When Grandpa, attempting to help Kirby, says it was to talk over selling the house, Alice has an outburst and says it was because she was engaged to Tony, but is spurning him because of how poorly she has been treated by his family. This causes a sensation in the papers, and Alice flees the city.

With Alice gone, Grandpa decides to sell the house, thus meaning the whole section of the town must vacate in preparation for building a new factory. Now, the Kirby companies merge, creating a huge fluctuation in the stock market. When Kirby's competitor, Ramsey (H. B. Warner), dies after confronting him for being ruthless and a failure of a man, Kirby has a realization he is heading for the same fate, and decides to leave the meeting where the signing of the contracts is to take place.

As the Vanderhofs are moving out of the house, Tony tries to track down Alice. Kirby arrives and talks privately with Grandpa, sharing his realization. Grandpa responds by inviting him to play "Polly Wolly Doodle" on the harmonica that he gave him. The two let loose with the rest of the family joining in the merriment, and with Alice taking Tony back. Later, at the dinner table, Grandpa says grace for the Sycamore family and the Kirbys, revealing that Kirby has sold back the houses on the block.

Cast

 Jean Arthur as Alice Sycamore
 Lionel Barrymore as Grandpa Martin Vanderhof
 James Stewart as Tony Kirby
 Edward Arnold as Anthony P. Kirby
 Mischa Auer as Potap Kolenkhov
 Ann Miller as Essie Carmichael
 Spring Byington as Penelope "Penny" Sycamore
 Samuel S. Hinds as Paul Sycamore
 Donald Meek as Poppins, an accountant at Kirby's bank
 H. B. Warner as Ramsey
 Halliwell Hobbes as DePinna
 Dub Taylor as Ed Carmichael
 Mary Forbes as Meriam Kirby, Anthony's wife
 Lillian Yarbo as Rheba
 Eddie Anderson as Donald
 Clarence Wilson as John Blakeley, Kirby's real estate broker
 Josef Swickard as the Professor
 Ann Doran as Maggie O'Neill
 Christian Rub as Mr. Schmidt
 Bodil Rosing as Mrs. Schmidt
 Charles Lane as Wilbur G. Henderson, IRS agent
 Harry Davenport as the Night Court Judge

Production

In November 1937, Harry Cohn of Columbia Pictures bought the film rights of the original play for $200,000 ($3,589,000 in 2019).

After seeing actor James Stewart portray "a sensitive, heart-grabbing role in MGM's Navy Blue and Gold", Frank Capra cast Stewart for the role of leading male character, Tony Kirby, to "[fit] his concept of idealized America".

Barrymore's infirmity was incorporated into the plot of the film. His character was on crutches the entire movie, which was said to be due to an accident from sliding down the banister. In reality, it was due to his increasing arthritis – earlier in the year he had been forced to withdraw from the movie A Christmas Carol.

Ann Miller, who plays Essie Carmichael (Ed Carmichael's wife), was only 15 when You Can't Take It with You was filmed.

Reception
Frank Nugent of The New York Times called the film "a grand picture, which will disappoint only the most superficial admirers of the play". Variety called it "fine audience material and over the heads of no one. The comedy is wholly American, wholesome, homespun, human, appealing, and touching in turn." The review suggested that "it could have been edited down a bit here and there, though as standing it is never tiresome". Film Daily wrote: "Smoothly directed, naturally acted and carefully produced, 'You Can't Take It With You' has all the elements of screen entertainment that the fans could wish for." "Excellent", wrote Harrison's Reports. "Robert Riskin did a fine job in adapting it from the stage play for he wisely placed emphasis on the human rather than on the farcical side of the story; yet he did this without sacrificing any of the comedy angles." John Mosher of The New Yorker thought that the stage version was superior, writing that many of the story's new additions for the screen made the film "a long one and at times a ponderous thing, the more so the further from the play the screen version strays".

Reviewing the film in 2010, James Berardinelli wrote that it "hasn't fared as well as the director's better, more timeless offerings" due to the dated nature of screwball comedies and the "innocence permeating the movie that doesn't play as well during an era when audiences value darkness in even the lightest of comedies. Still, You Can't Take it with You provides a pleasant enough two hours along with a reminder of how era-specific the criteria for winning an Oscar are".

Rotten Tomatoes gives the film a rating of 95% from 76 reviews and an average rating of 7.50/10. The consensus summarizes: "It's predictably uplifting fare from Frank Capra, perhaps the most consciously uplifting of all great American directors – but thanks to immensely appealing performances and a nimble script, You Can't Take It with You is hard not to love."

Academy Awards
Wins
 Best Picture: Columbia Pictures
 Best Director: Frank Capra

Nominations
 Best Supporting Actress: Spring Byington
 Best Writing (Screenplay): Robert Riskin
 Best Cinematography: Joseph Walker
 Best Film Editing: Gene Havlick
 Best Sound Recording: Columbia Studio Sound Department, John P. Livadary, Sound Director

Adaptations
You Can't Take it with You was adapted as a radio play on the October 2, 1939, broadcast of Lux Radio Theater with Edward Arnold, Robert Cummings and Fay Wray.

In popular culture
A line from this film, "Confidentially, she stinks!", said by Kolenkov the ballet master about one of his students, was used in a few Looney Tunes cartoons from the 1940s.

Digital restoration 
In 2013, Sony Colorworks and Prasad Corporation digitally restored the film, removing dirt, tears, scratches and other artifacts to emulate the film's original look.

References
Citations

Bibliography

External links

 
 
 
 
 
 
 You Can't Take It With You on Lux Radio Theater: October 2, 1939

1938 films
1938 romantic comedy films
1930s screwball comedy films
American romantic comedy films
American screwball comedy films
Best Picture Academy Award winners
American black-and-white films
Columbia Pictures films
1930s English-language films
Films scored by Dimitri Tiomkin
Films about families
American films based on plays
Films directed by Frank Capra
Films set in New York City
Films whose director won the Best Directing Academy Award
Films with screenplays by Robert Riskin
1930s American films